Constantin Levaditi (1 August 1874 – 5 September 1953) was a Romanian physician and microbiologist, a major figure in virology and immunology, especially in the study of poliomyelitis and syphilis.

Biography
He was born in Galați. His father, Spyridon Livaditis, of Greek descent (from Macedonia) was 30 years old and working as a customs officer. His mother, Ioana Ștefănescu, then aged 18 years, was the daughter of peasants from Focșani. The family name originates from the name of the town of Livadia (Livaditis means one who comes from Livadia). The researcher  (1901–1987) reported that Spyridon Livaditis was a member of the Filiki Eteria (Society of Friends), established to organize the Greek Revolution of 1821 against the Ottoman Empire under the leadership of Prince Alexander Ypsilantis.

He studied at Matei Basarab High School in Bucharest and at the Carol Davila University of Medicine and Pharmacy, where he studied under Victor Babeș. He then trained at the Collège de France in Paris, and with Paul Ehrlich in Frankfurt. In 1900, he was accepted by Ilya Ilyich Mechnikov to work in his team at the Pasteur Institute in Paris. Sometime after, Pierre Paul Émile Roux awarded him an independent laboratory within the Institute.

With Karl Landsteiner, he discovered in 1909 the presence of the poliovirus in tissues other than nervous. He expanded on these studies during a poliomyelitis outbreak in Sweden, working with Scandinavian researchers (among them Karl Oskar Medin); he was able to isolate the poliovirus on tissue explant and made precious observations on its characteristics. Together with Carl Kling, he authored the first monograph dedicated to the disease, La Poliomyélite aiguë épidémique (1913). His work was the basis for the development of the polio vaccine by Jonas Salk and Albert Sabin.

In his studies of syphilis, Levaditi introduced new techniques in serology, and recommended bismuth in its treatment.

After 1920, he continued his work in Romania, where he taught at the University of Medicine and Pharmacy in Bucharest. He was a member of the Académie Nationale de Médecine and an honorary member of the Romanian Academy. In 1928, Levatidi was awarded the Cameron Prize for Therapeutics of the University of Edinburgh.

References

External links
Short presentation at lincolnshirepostpolio.org.uk
 Biography at infobacau.ro
 Biography at virology.ro
 Levaditi archive funds at the Pasteur Institute

1874 births
1953 deaths
People from Galați
Honorary members of the Romanian Academy
Romanian bacteriologists
Romanian emigrants to France
Serologists
Romanian virologists
Carol Davila University of Medicine and Pharmacy alumni
Academic staff of the Carol Davila University of Medicine and Pharmacy
Académie Nationale de Médecine